Raja Rafe (born 1 May 1983 in Jaramana, Rif Dimashq, Syria) is a Syrian footballer who plays as a striker for Taliya SC, which competes in the Syrian Premier League, and is a member of the Syria national football team.

Rafe is Syria's all-time second goalscorer with 32 goals in 84 matches, preceded by Firas Al-Khatib.

International goals 
Scores and results list Syria's goal tally first.

Honours

Individual 
Syrian League Top Goalscorer: 2004, 2005, 2008, 2012, 2015, 2016.

References

External links
 

1983 births
Living people
Syrian people of Druze descent
Syrian Druze
Sportspeople from Damascus
Syrian footballers
Druze sportspeople
Association football forwards
Syria international footballers
Syrian expatriate footballers
Expatriate footballers in Iraq
Expatriate footballers in Kuwait
Expatriate footballers in Jordan
Expatriate footballers in Lebanon
Expatriate footballers in Saudi Arabia
Syrian expatriate sportspeople in Iraq
Syrian expatriate sportspeople in Kuwait
Syrian expatriate sportspeople in Lebanon
Syrian expatriate sportspeople in Jordan
Syrian expatriate sportspeople in Saudi Arabia
Al-Majd players
Al-Wehda Club (Mecca) players
Al-Arabi SC (Kuwait) players
Al-Shorta Damascus players
Al-Wahda SC (Syria) players
Footballers at the 2006 Asian Games
Saudi Professional League players
Asian Games competitors for Syria
Lebanese Premier League players
Nejmeh SC players
Syrian Premier League players
Kuwait Premier League players